Nikolai Belyaev may refer to:

 Nikolai Belyaev (politician) (1903–1966), Soviet politician, leader of the Kazakhstan branch of Soviet Communist Party
 Nikolai Belyaev (general), Soviet general during the Battle of Tolvajärvi in World War II
 Nikolai Vasilievich Belyaev (1859–1920), Russian philanthropist and entrepreneur